KHWR-LP (92.7 FM) is a low-power FM radio station licensed to McAlester, Oklahoma, United States. The station is currently owned by Flames Of Truth Crusades.

History
The station was assigned the call sign KHWR on February 17, 2014.

References

External links
 

HWR-LP
HWR-LP
Radio stations established in 2017
2017 establishments in Oklahoma